Petra Krause (born February 19, 1939 in Berlin) is a German-Italian former terrorist who in the 1970s, with her gang, supplied weapons to groups including the Red Army Fraction (RAF) in Germany and the Red Brigades in Italy.

In 1975 she was arrested in Zurich on suspicion of smuggling explosives and arms for various terrorist groups throughout half of Europe. She was defended by attorney Bernard Rambert of the "Legal Advice Collective" (Rechtsauskunft Anwaltskollektiv) and in 1977 extradited to Italy, where she was released after a few days. In 1981, she was sentenced in absentia by the Court of Appeals of the Canton of Zürich.

The proceedings against Krause in Switzerland took place against the background of the events of the German Autumn, and also led to controversy over the conditions of her detention. This was also the time of leftist terrorism in Switzerland.

Krause was friends with the German politician and DDR agent Brigitte Heinrich. In Zurich she had worked for a short time with the bookseller Theo Pinkus.

References

1939 births
Living people